Servicio de Inteligencia Naval (Naval Intelligence Service) is the intelligence agency of the Argentine Navy. It is part of J-2 and of the General Staff of the Navy, and its current director is Vice Admiral IM (Infantería de Marina) Enrique Salvador Olmedo. Its duties include gathering naval intelligence relevant to Argentina.

See also
Argentine Navy
Army Intelligence Service
Air Force Intelligence Service
National Intelligence System
National Directorate of Strategic Military Intelligence

External links
 

Argentine intelligence agencies
Argentine Navy
Naval intelligence